The Young Achievers Awards (YAA) is a national competition held annually in Uganda which selects and promotes the best practice and excellence in youth creativity. 

By demonstrating a young person's potential to create an outstanding nation built on entrepreneurship, YAA aims at recognizing Uganda's leaders of tomorrow today. It provides an opportunity for people to work together to address national developmental challenges in ICT, the Arts, Health, Education, Gender and access to better lives.

History 
Founded in 2009 by Awel Uwihanganye and Ivan Serwano Kyambadde, the Award was created as a platform to showcase young people creating economic opportunity, attaining financial independence and improve their leadership abilities .

Award categories 
Young Achiever - Business and Trade
Young Achiever - Media and Society
Young Achiever - Leadership and Governance
Young Achiever - Art, Fashion and Culture
Young Achiever - Music and Entertainment
Young Achiever - Sports
Young Achiever - I.C.T Solutions
Overall Young Achievers of the Year
Young Achiever's Heroes/Heroine Award
Lifetime Achievement Award
Young Achievers Star Hall Of Fame
Overall Young Achiever

See also
 List of Young Achievers Award winners

References

Business and industry awards
Ugandan awards
Awards honoring children or youth
Youth in Uganda